Sermbhan Chongrak (born 31 August 1938) is a Thai weightlifter. He competed in the men's bantamweight event at the 1964 Summer Olympics.

References

1938 births
Living people
Sermbhan Chongrak
Sermbhan Chongrak
Weightlifters at the 1964 Summer Olympics
Place of birth missing (living people)